Apple Valley High School (AVHS) is a public four-year high school in the U.S. city of Apple Valley, Minnesota. It is one of the five high schools serving Independent School District 196 (Rosemount-Apple Valley-Eagan School District). The school was completed in 1976 as the second high school added to the district. It competes in the South Suburban Conference of the Minnesota State High School League (MSHSL).

Curriculum
Through the Minnesota state Post Secondary Enrollment Options (PSEO) program, students are eligible to take classes at state colleges and universities.

Awards
Apple Valley High School received an award from the Blue Ribbon Schools Program, which is considered the highest accolade an American school can receive. It has also been selected as one of the "140 best high schools" in the United States, and has gained recognition from the National Endowment for the Arts, the Scholastic Coach and Athletic Journal, and the National Academy of Recording Arts and Science.

Athletics
Apple Valley High School competes in the South Suburban Conference of the Minnesota State High School League (MSHSL). Since opening in 1976, the school has accumulated 68 state championships, the second most of any high school in Minnesota.

Forensics

Apple Valley High School hosts the annual MinneApple annual debate tournament, which draws teams from across the Midwest.

In 2019, the school won the Minnesota High School Mock Trial Championship.

Fab lab
In 2015, Apple Valley High School opened a fab lab, the third in Minnesota, to individuals and businesses as part of its STEM program. It was built with a $3 million grant from the Minnesota Department of Labor and donations from companies such as Uponor and UTC Aerospace Systems.

Notable alumni
 Brady Beeson, former placekicker for the Portland Thunder of the Arena Football League (AFL), currently plays for the Spokane Empire of the Indoor Football League (IFL), played collegiately at St. John's University and the University of St. Thomas.
 Rebekah Bradford, speed skater, competed for the United States in the 2010 Winter Olympics
 Brianna Brown, class of 1998, actress
 Arden Cho, model and actress
 Brad DeFauw, former ice hockey winger for the Carolina Hurricanes of the National Hockey League (NHL)
 Breanne Duren, touring member of the electronica project Owl City
 Hudson Fasching, ice hockey winger playing for the Tucson Roadrunners of the American Hockey League (AHL) under contract to the NHL's Buffalo Sabres
 David Fischer, hockey player, first-round pick by the Montreal Canadiens in 2006
 Karl Goehring, goaltender for the Nashville Predators
 Mark Hall, 6-time State Champion wrestler, Dave Schultz High School Excellence Award winner (2016), and 2017 NCAA Wrestling Champion at Penn State
 John Harvatine IV, co-owner of Stoopid Buddy Stoodios and executive producer on Robot Chicken
 Doug Hutchison, an actor, most notable role as Percy Wetmore in The Green Mile (film)
 Erik Jensen, film and television actor 
 Tre Jones, point guard for the San Antonio Spurs, played collegiately for the Duke Blue Devils, younger brother of Tyus Jones.
 Tyus Jones, point guard for the Memphis Grizzlies, played collegiately at Duke University.
 Vincent Kartheiser, class of 1997, actor who played Pete Campbell on the AMC drama Mad Men
 Ann Kim, award-winning chef and owner of Pizzeria Lola, Hello Pizza, and Young Joni
 Trevor Laws, drafted by the Philadelphia Eagles of the NFL, former Minnesota Gatorade Player of the Year and defensive lineman at Notre Dame
 Mike Lundin, former NHL defenseman for the Minnesota Wild
 Tara Mack, Minnesota House of Representatives member
 Shani Marks, triple jumper who competed in the 2008 Summer Olympics
 Bob Martin, former center in the NBA for the Los Angeles Clippers (1993–95)
 David Maurer, former Major League Baseball (MLB) pitcher for the San Diego Padres, Cleveland Indians, and Toronto Blue Jays
 Leyna Nguyen, on-air anchor and reporter with KCAL-TV in Los Angeles, California since 1997
 Trey Pipkins, gridiron football player
 Derek Rackley, tight end and long snapper for the Seattle Seahawks
 Nicholas Sadler, an actor who has appeared in the films Scent of a Woman, Disclosure, Mobsters, as well as TV shows like The Cosby Show and ER
 Dan Sexton, right wing for the Anaheim Ducks of the NHL
 Carol Ann Shudlick, 1990 Minnesota Miss Basketball, played collegiately for the University of Minnesota, 1994 Wade Trophy Winner and former Gophers' all-time scoring leader.
 Dan Smith, Class of 1987, former player for the Texas Rangers
 Varmah Sonie, 2008 Minnesota Mr. Football.
 Gable Steveson, Olympic gold medal-winning wrestler and 2020 Big Ten Heavyweight Champion and 2021 & 2022 NCAA Division I Heavyweight Champion for the University of Minnesota.
 Maria Thayer, actress and comedian
 Erik Westrum, an NHL center who played for the Phoenix Coyotes, Minnesota Wild and Toronto Maple Leafs

Notes

External links
Official website of Apple Valley High School
Robotics Team Site
EaglEye News Program

Public high schools in Minnesota
Educational institutions established in 1976
Schools in Dakota County, Minnesota
1976 establishments in Minnesota